The Industrial Complex at 221 McKibbin Street is an American historic industrial complex, located in the East Williamsburg neighborhood of the Brooklyn borough of New York City, New York.

Description and history
The complex consists of ten interconnected structures built between about 1845 and 1951.  The most prominent building is the three-story brick spinning house of the H. Lawrence & Sons Rope Works, built before 1870.  In addition to rope manufacturers, the complex had cardboard manufacturers, glass making, knitting, silk weaving, and wood working.

It was listed on the National Register of Historic Places in 2009.

The Industrial Complex at 221 McKibbin Street is located on McKibbin Street, sharing the block with a range of buildings including PS 147, Sure We Can, and the McKibbin Street Lofts.

See also

 National Register of Historic Places listings in Kings County, New York

References

1840s architecture in the United States
1845 establishments in New York (state)
Industrial buildings completed in 1845
Industrial buildings and structures on the National Register of Historic Places in New York City
National Register of Historic Places in Brooklyn
Williamsburg, Brooklyn